Cherry Orchard may refer to:

 The Cherry Orchard, a play by Anton Chekhov.
 The Cherry Orchard (1974 film), an adaptation on Australian television, starring Googie Withers
 The Cherry Orchard (1981 film), an adaptation on British television, starring Judi Dench
 The Cherry Orchard (1990 film), a Japanese manga series about a production of the play 
 The Cherry Orchard (1999 film), an international coproduction of the play, starring Charlotte Rampling 
 A cherry orchard, for the cultivation of cherries
 Cherry Orchard, Dublin, Ireland, a suburb 
 Cherry Orchard F.C., an association football club in the Dublin suburb 
 Park West and Cherry Orchard railway station, a railway station in the Dublin suburb 
 Cherry Orchard Bog Natural Area Preserve, a natural area preserve in Virginia

See also
Orchard (disambiguation)